The 2015–16 Serie A season was the 82nd season of the Serie A, the top level of ice hockey in Italy. 8 teams participated in the league, and Asiago Hockey won the championship. Ritten Sport won the League Cup.

Regular season

External links 
 Lega Italiana Hockey Ghiaccio website
 Elite Prospects

Ita
Serie A
Serie A (ice hockey) seasons